James McCoy Jones is an African-American social psychologist and cultural diversity scholar. He is Trustees' Distinguished Professor Emeritus of Psychological and Brain Sciences and Black American Studies and Director of the Center for the Study of Diversity at the University of Delaware. He is a past president of both the Society of Experimental Social Psychology and the Society for the Psychological Study of Social Issues.He previously taught at Harvard University and Howard University before joining the University of Delaware. In 2011, he received the Outstanding Lifetime Contributions to Psychology Award from the American Psychological Association. He retired from the University of Delaware in 2018, and gave a retirement lecture on diversity on April 16 of that year.

Selected publications 

 Prejudice and Racism (1972, second edition in 1997)
 The Psychology of Diversity: Beyond prejudice and racism, with co-authors Jack Dovidio and Deborah Vietze, 2014.

References

External links
Faculty profile
Profile at Social Psychology Network

African-American psychologists
Oberlin College alumni
Temple University alumni
Yale University alumni
University of Delaware faculty
Harvard University faculty
Howard University faculty
21st-century African-American people
Living people

Year of birth missing (living people)